Shathah (šaṭḥat at-taḥta) is a town in northwestern Syria, administratively part of the Hama Governorate, located northwest of Hama. Nearby localities include Slinfah to the northwest, Nabl al-Khatib and Farikah to the north, al-Huwash to the northeast, Huwayjat al-Sallah to the southeast, Inab to the south and Ayn al-Tineh to the west.

According to the Syria Central Bureau of Statistics (CBS), Shathah had a population of 8,076 in the 2004 census. It is the administrative center and largest town of Shathah Subdistrict, which consisted of 12 localities with a collective population of 25,273 in 2004. Its inhabitants are predominantly Alawites.

References

Alawite communities in Syria
Towns in Hama Governorate
Populated places in al-Suqaylabiyah District
Populated places in al-Ghab Plain